The Fitilieh programme protests started on 9 November 2015 after a segment of the children's television programme Fitileh, aired on 6 November on local state TV, depicted an Azeri speaking Iranian brushing his teeth with a toilet brush. 

As a result, hundreds of people participated in demonstrations in Tabriz, Urmia, Ardabil, Zanjan and Tehran. Police in Iran clashed with protesting people and fired tear gas to disperse crowds, with protesters being arrested. One of the protesters, Ali Akbar Morteza, reportedly "died of injuries" in Urmia. There were also protests held in front of Iranian embassies in Istanbul and Baku.

The head of the country’s state broadcaster Islamic Republic of Iran Broadcasting (IRIB) Mohammad Sarafraz apologized for airing the program. The broadcast of Fitilehha was cancelled, after 12 years of airing.

See also 
 Iran newspaper cockroach cartoon controversy

References

Sources 
 Frud Bezhan. Azeris Hold Protests In Iran Over Racial Slur // Radio Free Europe. — 2015. — 9 November.
 Iran’s ethnic Azeris protest slur on TV program // The Washington Post. — 2015. — 9 November.
 Iran's Azeris protest over offensive TV show // BBC. — 2015. — 9 November.

Mass media in Iran
2015 controversies
Anti-Azerbaijanism in Iran
2015 in Iran
Protests in Iran
2015 protests
November 2015 events in Iran